The 1920 World Series was the championship series for Major League Baseball's 1920 season. The series was a best-of-nine format played between the American League (AL) champion Cleveland Indians and the National League (NL) champion Brooklyn Robins, with the Indians defeating the Robins five games to two. The only World Series triple play, the first World Series grand slam and the first World Series home run by a pitcher all occurred in Game 5 of this Series. It was also the first World Series and first Big Four championship series to feature two brothers on opposing teams, with Doc Johnston playing for Cleveland and Jimmy Johnston playing for Brooklyn.

The Indians won the series in memory of their former shortstop Ray Chapman, who had been killed earlier in the season when struck in the head by a pitched ball.  The triple play was unassisted and turned by Cleveland's Bill Wambsganss in Game 5. Wambsganss, playing second base, caught a line drive off the bat of Clarence Mitchell, stepped on second base to put out Pete Kilduff, and tagged Otto Miller coming from first base. It was the second of 15 (as of 2022) unassisted triple plays in major-league baseball history, and it remains the only one in postseason play. Mitchell made history again in the eighth inning by hitting into a double play, accounting for five outs in two straight at-bats.

The fifth game also saw the first grand slam in World Series history (hit by Cleveland's Elmer Smith) and the first Series home run by a pitcher (Cleveland's Jim Bagby, Sr.). And in that same game, Brooklyn outhit Cleveland but lost 8–1.

Cleveland had won the American League pennant in a close race with the Chicago White Sox and the New York Yankees. The Sox's participation in the Black Sox Scandal the previous year had caught up to them late in the season, and their star players were suspended with three games left in the season, when they were in a virtual tie with the Indians. The Yankees, with their recently acquired star Babe Ruth, were almost ready to start their eventual World Series dynasty. For Cleveland, it would prove to be one of their few successes in a long history of largely either poor or not-quite-good enough clubs.

It is notable that all seven games of the 1920 World Series were won by the team who scored first. In fact, Game 4 was the only game in which the losing team scored a run before the winning team had scored all of its runs. The lead never changed hands in any game.

This would be the last World Series until  to feature two franchises that had not previously won a championship.

Summary

Matchups

Game 1

Game 1 took a mere 1 hour, 41 minutes. Steve O'Neill supplied RBI doubles in the second and fourth innings in support of Stan Coveleski, who won it for the visiting Indians with a five-hitter.

Game 2

A first-inning run on a Jimmy Johnston single and Zack Wheat double would be all Dodger pitcher Burleigh Grimes would require in a complete-game shutout.

Game 3

Brooklyn scored twice in the first on hits by Zack Wheat and Hi Myers that chased Cleveland starter Ray Caldwell from the game. The only run winning pitcher Sherry Smith gave up in a three-hitter came when Tris Speaker came all the way around on a double that was misplayed in left field.

Game 4

Brooklyn starter Leon Cadore didn't make it past the first inning. His relievers didn't fare much better, Al Mamaux being removed in the third and Rube Marquard greeted by a George Burns two-run double. Stan Coveleski cruised with a five-hitter for his second win of the Series.

Game 5

The Cleveland Times ran the following article on Monday, October 11, 1920, recounting Game 5 and Wambsganss' triple play:

Wamby Makes Unassisted Triple Play
CLEVELAND, Sunday Oct 10, 1920 – Bill Wambsganss' unassisted triple play highlighted the most unusual game in World Series history today and helped the Cleveland Indians to a wild 8–1 victory over the Brooklyn Robins. Elmer Smith hit a grand slam and Jim Bagby also homered as the Indians took the lead in games three to two. The triple play and grand slam had never happened before in World Series history and Bagby became the first pitcher to homer in a World Series. "I've been in baseball 40 years", Robins manager Wilbert Robinson said, "and I never saw one like this." The first Indian to face Burleigh Grimes was Charlie Johnson, who singled. He stopped at second on Wambsganss' single. Then Grimes fell fielding Tris Speaker's bunt, loading the bases. Then Smith hit a 1–2 pitch over the right field screen for a 4–0 lead. In the home fourth, Doc Johnston singled to center and moved up on a passed ball. After Grimes put Steve O'Neill on, Bagby homered into the center field stands. Pete Kilduff began the top of the fifth with a single to left center. When Otto Miller singled to center, Speaker's quick throw to third drove Kilduff back to second. That brought up reliever Clarence Mitchell, who went six for sixteen as a pinch-hitter this season and sometimes fills in at first base and in the outfield. A left-handed hitter, he drove the ball toward right center. Second baseman Wambsganss moved slightly to his right, tipped onto his toes, sprung a little bit and grabbed the ball with his gloved hand. Never hesitating, he continued to second base, easily doubling Kilduff. Then when Wamby turned to throw to first base he saw Miller frozen directly in front of him. Reaching out, Wamby tagged Miller easily. The crowd was silent momentarily, then, realizing what had happened, broke into thunderous applause. In the Brooklyn eighth, Ernie Krueger singled to center. But Mitchell grounded to first baseman Johnson, who started a double play. Thus, Mitchell accounted for five outs in two at-bats.

Game 6

Even faster than Game 1, this one was done in just 94 minutes. Duster Mails twirled a three-hit shutout, and the lone run came in the sixth on a Tris Speaker two-out single, followed by a George Burns double.

Game 7

The Robins didn't score in the last two games. Their pitcher, Burleigh Grimes, committed an error on a Cleveland double steal that resulted in the game's first run. Stan Coveleski needed no more, but got one in the fifth from a Tris Speaker run-scoring triple and another in the seventh on Charlie Jamieson's RBI double. Spitball pitcher Coveleski won for the third time and the Indians celebrated before their home fans.

Composite line score
1920 World Series (5–2): Cleveland Indians (A.L.) over Brooklyn Robins (N.L.)

Notes

References

External links

World Series
World Series
Cleveland Indians postseason
Brooklyn Dodgers postseason
World Series
World Series
1920s in Cleveland
Baseball competitions in New York City
World Series
Baseball competitions in Cleveland
1920s in Brooklyn
Flatbush, Brooklyn